Karl Johann Kautsky (16 October 1854 – 17 October 1938) was a Czech-Austrian philosopher, journalist, and Marxist theorist. Kautsky was one of the most authoritative promulgators of orthodox Marxism after the death of Friedrich Engels in 1895 until the outbreak of World War I in 1914.

He was the most important socialist theorist during the years of the Second International. He founded the socialist journal Neue Zeit. Following the war, Kautsky was an outspoken critic of the Bolshevik Revolution, engaging in polemics with Vladimir Lenin, Leon Trotsky and Joseph Stalin on the nature of the Soviet state.

Life and career

Early years
Karl Kautsky was born in Prague of an artistic and middle class family – his parents were Johann Kautsky (a Czech scenic designer) and Minna, née Jaich (an Austrian actress and writer of Czech descent). The family moved to Vienna when Kautsky was the age of seven. He studied history, philosophy and economics at the University of Vienna from 1874, and became a member of the Social Democratic Party of Austria (SPÖ) in 1875. Shortly afterwards he published his first contributions in the German socialist journals Der Volksstaat and Vorwärts and to the Austrian journals Gleichheit and Der Sozialist.

In 1880 he joined a group of German socialists in Zürich who were supported financially by Karl Höchberg, and who smuggled socialist material into Germany at the time of the Anti-Socialist Laws (1878–1890).

Political career
In 1883, Kautsky founded the monthly Die Neue Zeit ("The New Times") in Stuttgart, which became a weekly in 1890. He edited the magazine until September 1917: this gave him a steady income and allowed him to propagate Marxism.
From 1885 to 1890 he spent time in London, where he became a close friend of Friedrich Engels. His position as a prominent Marxist theorist was assured in 1888, when Engels put him to the task of editing Marx's three-volume work Theories of Surplus Value. In 1891 he co-authored the Erfurt Program of the Social Democratic Party of Germany (SPD) together with August Bebel and Eduard Bernstein. 

Following the death of Engels in 1895, Kautsky became one of the most important and influential theoreticians of Marxism, representing the mainstream of the party together with August Bebel, and outlining a Marxist theory of imperialism. When Bernstein attacked the traditional Marxist position of the necessity for revolution in the late 1890s, Kautsky denounced him, arguing that Bernstein's emphasis on the ethical foundations of Socialism opened the road to a call for an alliance with the "progressive" bourgeoisie and a non-class approach.

Wartime years
In 1914, when the German Social-Democrat deputies in the Reichstag voted for war credits, Kautsky (who was not a deputy but attended their meetings) suggested abstaining. Kautsky claimed that Germany was waging a defensive war against the threat of Czarist Russia. However, in June 1915, about ten months after the war had begun and when it had become obvious that this was going to be a sustained, appallingly brutal and costly struggle, he issued an appeal with Eduard Bernstein and Hugo Haase against the pro-war leaders of the SPD and denounced the German government's annexationist aims. In 1917 he left the SPD for the Independent Social Democratic Party of Germany (USPD) with united socialists who opposed the war.

After the November Revolution in Germany, Kautsky served as under-secretary of State in the Foreign Office in the short-lived SPD-USPD revolutionary government and worked at finding documents which proved the war guilt of Imperial Germany.

Post-war years

In 1920, when the USPD split, he went with a minority of that party back into the SPD. He visited Georgia in 1920 and wrote a book on the Democratic Republic of Georgia that at that moment was still independent of Bolshevist Russia. By the time it was published in 1921, Georgia had been thoroughly influenced by the Russian Civil War, the Red Army had invaded Georgia, and the Bolsheviks had imposed the Georgian Soviet Socialist Republic. By that point, Kautsky considered the Soviet Union to have become an imperialist state, due to the destructiveness of the invasion of Georgia, and the minimal political role that the actual proletariat had in Soviet Russia.

Kautsky assisted in the creation of the party program adopted in Heidelberg (1925) by the German Social Democratic Party. In 1924, at the age of 70, he moved back to Vienna with his family, and remained there until 1938. At the time of Hitler's Anschluss, he fled to Czechoslovakia and thence by plane to Amsterdam, where he died in the same year.

Karl Kautsky lived in Berlin-Friedenau for many years; his wife, Luise Kautsky, became a close friend of Rosa Luxemburg, who also lived in Friedenau. A commemorative plaque marks where Kautsky lived at Saarstraße 14.

Vladimir Lenin described Kautsky as a "renegade" in his pamphlet The Proletarian Revolution and the Renegade Kautsky; Kautsky in turn castigated Lenin in his 1934 work Marxism and Bolshevism: Democracy and Dictatorship:

A collection of excerpts of Kautsky's writings, Social Democracy vs. Communism, discussed Bolshevist rule in Russia. He saw the Bolsheviks (or Communists) as a conspiratorial organization that had gained power by a coup and initiated revolutionary changes for which there was no economic rationale in Russia. Instead, a bureaucracy-dominated society developed, the miseries of which outweighed the problems of Western capitalism, he argued. He stated:

Death and legacy

Kautsky died on 17 October 1938, in Amsterdam. His son, spent seven years in concentration camps; his wife, Luise Kautsky, was murdered in Auschwitz.

Kautsky is notable for, in addition to his anti-Bolshevik polemics, his editing and publication of Marx's Capital, Volume IV (usually published as Theories of Surplus Value).

Works in English

 The Economic Doctrines of Karl Marx. (1887/1903)
 Thomas More and his Utopia. (1888)
 The Class Struggle (Erfurt Program). Daniel DeLeon, trans. New York: New York Labor News Co., 1899.
 Communism in Central Europe at the Time of the Reformation. J.L. & E.G. Mulliken, trans. London: T.F. Unwin, 1897.
 Forerunners of Modern Socialism, 1895.
 Frederick Engels: His Life, His Work and His Writings. May Wood Simons, trans. Chicago: Charles H. Kerr & Co., 1899.
 On the Agrarian Question (1899), Pete Burgess, trans. London: Zwan Publications, 1988.
 The Social Revolution and On the Day After the Social Revolution. J. B. Askew, trans. London: Twentieth Century Press, 1903.
 Socialism and Colonial Policy (1907)
 The Historic Accomplishment of Karl Marx (1908)
 Ethics and the Materialist Conception of History. J. B. Askew, trans. Chicago: Charles H. Kerr & Co., 1909.
 The Road to Power A.M. Simons, trans. Chicago: Samuel A. Bloch, 1909.
 The Class Struggle (Erfurt Program). William E. Bohn, trans. Chicago: Charles H. Kerr & Co., 1909.
 Finance-Capital and Crises (1911)
 The High Cost of Living: Changes in Gold Production and the Rise in Prices. Chicago: Charles H. Kerr & Co., 1914.
 The Guilt of William Hohenzollern. London: Skeffington and Son, n.d. (1919).
 The Dictatorship of the Proletariat. H. J. Stenning, trans. London: National Labour Press, n.d. (c. 1919).
 Terrorism and Communism: A Contribution to the Natural History of Revolution. W.H. Kerridge, trans. London: National Labour Press, 1920.
 "Preface" to The Twelve Who Are to Die: The Trial of the Socialists-Revolutionists in Moscow. Berlin: Delegation of the Party of Socialists-Revolutionists, 1922.
 Foundations of Christianity: A Study of Christian Origins. New York: International Publishers, 1925.
 The Labour Revolution. H. J. Stenning, trans. London: National Labour Press, 1925.
 Are the Jews a Race? New York: International Publishers, 1926.
 Communism vs. Socialism. Joseph Shaplen, trans. New York: American League for Democratic Socialism, 1932.

See also
 The Proletarian Revolution and the Renegade Kautsky, a response to Kautsky written by Vladimir Lenin. (1918). Text.
 Terrorism and Communism, a pamphlet written by Leon Trotsky in response to a Kautsky pamphlet by the same name (1920). Text.

Footnotes

Sources

Further reading
 
 Donald, Moira. (1993). Marxism and Revolution: Karl Kautsky and the Russian Marxists, 1900–1924. New Haven: Yale University Press.
 Gaido, Daniel. "Karl Kautsky on capitalism in the ancient World." Journal of Peasant Studies 30.2 (2003): 146–158.
 Gaido, Daniel. "'The American Worker' and the Theory of Permanent Revolution: Karl Kautsky on Werner Sombart's Why Is There No Socialism in the United States?." Historical Materialism 11.4 (2003): 79–123. online
 Geary, Dick. Karl Kautsky (Manchester: Manchester University Press, 1987).
 Gronow, Jukka. On the Formation of Marxism: Karl Kautsky's Theory of Capitalism, the Marxism of the Second International and Karl Marx's Critique of Political Economy. [2015] Chicago: Haymarket Books, 2016.
 Kołakowski, Leszek, Main Currents of Marxism. P.S. Falla, trans. New York: W.W. Norton & Co., 2005.
 Nygaard, Bertel. "Constructing Marxism: Karl Kautsky and the French revolution." History of European Ideas 35.4 (2009): 450–464.
 Salvadori, Massimo L. Karl Kautsky and the Socialist Revolution, 1880-1938. Jon Rothschild, trans. London: New Left Books, 1979.
 Steenson, Gary P. Karl Kautsky, 1854–1938: Marxism in the Classical Years. Pittsburgh, PA: University of Pittsburgh Press, 1978.

Primary sources 
 Kautsky, Karl. Karl Kautsky on Democracy and Republicanism., edited and translated by Ben Lewis. Leiden: Brill, 2019.

External links 

 Karl Kautsky at the Marxists Internet Archive
 Kautsky post card
 Archive of Karl Kautsky Papers at the International Institute of Social History
 

1854 births
1938 deaths
Writers from Prague
People from the Kingdom of Bohemia
19th-century German writers
19th-century German male writers
20th-century German writers
German philosophers
German atheists
Marxist theorists
Orthodox Marxists
Social Democratic Party of Germany politicians
People of the German Empire
German Bohemian people
Czech people of Austrian descent
European democratic socialists
German magazine founders
Politicians from Prague
People from Tempelhof-Schöneberg
19th-century Czech philosophers